Kim Ho-sun is a Korean name consisting of the family name Kim and the given name Ho-sun. It may refer to Kim Ho-soon or Kim Ho-seon. People with this name include:

Kim Ho-soon (cyclist) (born 1926), South Korean cyclist
Kim Ho-sun (director) (born 1941), South Korean film director